Annecy-le-Vieux is a former commune in the Haute-Savoie department in the Auvergne-Rhône-Alpes region in southeastern France. On 1 January 2017, it was merged into the commune Annecy.

It was the fourth-largest commune in Haute-Savoie in terms of population, and is located on the northeastern shore of Lake Annecy.  It is essentially a residential suburb of Annecy, being less than 3 km from its centre, and is sometimes known at the "16th arrondissement" of Annecy.

The last mayor of Annecy-le-Vieux was Bernard Accoyer, who served from 1989 until December 2016. A doctor by profession, he is also the député of the district and has been president of the UMP group in the Assemblée nationale since 2002.

Geography

The commune is 50% urbanised with 33 hectares of public forest, and 50% agricultural and forests.

The commune is located on the foothills of Mount Veyrier (1,291 m), on a moraine at the junction of two old large glaciers.

The Fier forms most of the commune's northern border.

History
The shores of Lake Annecy have been occupied since at least 4000 BCE.  A Gallic tribe, the Allobroges, occupied the area in pre-Roman times: the Allobroges were conquered by the Roman legions in 62 BCE. The area was then colonised by Rome, which founded the town of Boutae (later Annecy) in 50 BCE.  The town was at a strategic crossroads of three Roman roads across the Alps (to Italy, to Geneva, and to Vienna), and grew rapidly to a population of several thousand.  Roman villas are found in the surrounding countryside.

Annecy was attacked by invaders in the post-Roman period, but regained its importance from CE 1107.

Its population had grown to 470 inhabitants by 1756.  Grape vines for producing wine have been cultivated on the surrounding hills since the Middle Ages.

Various artists lived in the area in the late 19th and early 20th centuries, including Eugène Sue, Adolphe de Custine, John Ruskin and Gabriel Fauré.

Two principal industrial activities arose in the mid-19th century, the Cléchet flour mill and the Paccard Bell Foundry.  One of largest bells in the world, "La Savoyarde" which hangs at the Sacré-Cœur in Paris, was cast in Annecy-le-Vieux in 1891.  It weighs 18,835 kg, stands 3.06 m tall, has a circumference of 9.60 m, is 22 cm thick at the base, and has a clapper weighing 850 kg.

At the end of the 19th century, attacks of mildew and phylloxera almost completely destroyed the grape vines.  Wine cultivation was replaced by dairy production.

Annecy includes a university site, attached to the Université de Savoie, with more than 4,000 students in 2003. The university offers programs in technology, commercial arts and trades, engineering, and particle physics.

Tourism
Attractions include the beach Annecy-le-Vieux, boating on Lake Annecy, walking in the hills, including Mount Rampon (957 m), Mount Veyrier (1291 m) and Mount Rampignon (894 m).

Annual events include the Ancilevienne, a  race for teams of runners and cyclists around Lake Annecy, and the Gabriel Fauré music festival.

Twin towns
 Dori, Burkina Faso

See also
Communes of the Haute-Savoie department

References

External links

 Town hall
 cinam.com
 Image
 tourism-annecy.net
 annecytourisme.com

Former communes of Haute-Savoie
Allobroges
Populated places disestablished in 2017
Haute-Savoie communes articles needing translation from French Wikipedia